No. 115 Squadron was a Royal Canadian Air Force Canadian Home War Establishment (HWE) Squadron that operated during World War II.

Operational history

No. 115 Squadron flew anti-submarine patrols along the coasts of British Columbia and Southeast Alaska as part of Western Air Command.

They claimed to have damaged the submarine. Based on the Bolingbroke's report, the United States Coast Guard cutter , the U.S. Coast Guard-manned United States Navy patrol vessel , and the Royal Canadian Navy minesweeper  proceeded to the area on 9 July 1942 and began a search for the submarine, which McLane and YP-251 claimed to sink later that day. The Bolingbroke crew shared credit with McLane and YP-251 for the sinking, and in 1947 the Joint Army-Navy Assessment Committee identified their victim as the Imperial Japanese Navy submarine . In 1967, however, the U.S. Navy retracted this assessment because Ro-32 had been inactive in Japan at the time of the sinking and was found afloat in Japan at the end of the war. The submarine reportedly sunk on 9 July 1942 remains unidentified.

No. 115 Squadron disbanded at Tolfino, British Columbia, in August 1944.

Equipment
Bristol Bolingbroke I (August - December 1941)
Bristol Bolingbroke IV (November 1941 - August 1943)
Lockheed Ventura GR.V (August 1943 - August 1944)
The squadron's two-letter squadron code was BK from August 1939 to May 1942, then UV until the RCAF HWE discontinued the use of squadron codes on 16 October 1942 "for security reasons".

See also
 List of Royal Canadian Air Force squadrons
 List of aircraft of the Canadian Air Force
 List of Royal Canadian Air Force stations

Notes

References

Footnotes

Bibliography
 Bruhn, David D. Battle Stars for the "Cactus Navy": America's Fishing Vessels and Yachts in World War II. Berwyn Heights, Maryland: Heritage Books 2014. 
 Coyle, Brendan. "Of Ghosts and Submarines." Vancouver Sun. 18 August 2008. Accessed 19 November 2021.
 Kostenuk, S. and J. Griffin. RCAF Squadron Histories and Aircraft: 1924–1968. Toronto: Samuel Stevens, Hakkert & Company, 1977. .
 No. 115 Squadron. 

Royal Canadian Air Force squadrons (disbanded)
Military units and formations of Canada in World War II
Canadian Forces aircraft squadrons